XM Music Lab was an XM Satellite Radio online exclusive music channel. The channel was removed from satellite lineup on April 17, 2006. Music Lab aired mainly progressive rock and jam bands.

See also
XM Satellite Radio channel history

Defunct radio stations in the United States
Radio stations established in 2001
Radio stations disestablished in 2006